Clinical research ethics are the set of relevant ethics considered in the conduct of a clinical trial in the field of clinical research. It borrows from the broader fields of research ethics and medical ethics.

Governance

Most directly a local institutional review board oversees the clinical research ethics of any given clinical trial. The institutional review board understands and acts according to local and national law. Each countries national law is guided by international principles, such as the Belmont Report's directive that all study participants have a right to "respect for persons", "beneficence", and "justice" when participating in clinical research.

Study participant rights
Participants in clinical research have rights which they should expect, including the following:

right to informed consent
shared decision-making
privacy for research participants
return of results
right to withdraw

Vulnerable populations
There is a range of autonomy which study participants may have in deciding their participation in clinical research. One of the measures for safeguarding this right is the use of informed consent for clinical researches. Researchers refer to populations which have low autonomy as "vulnerable populations"; these are groups which may not be able to fairly decide for themselves whether to participate in clinical trials. Examples of groups which are vulnerable populations include incarcerated persons, children, prisoners, soldiers, people under detention, migrants, persons exhibiting insanity or any other condition which precludes their autonomy, and to a lesser extent, any population for which there is reason to believe that the research study could seem particularly or unfairly persuasive or misleading. There are particular ethical problems using children in clinical trials.

See also
 Unethical human experimentation

References

Further reading

 The Oxford Textbook of Clinical Research Ethics, Ezekiel Emanuel, Christine Grady, Robert Crouch, Reidar Lie, Franklin Miller, David Wendler, Oxford University Press, 2008

External links
list of research participant rights from Harvard School of Public Health

 
Research ethics